was one of 18   escort destroyers built for the Imperial Japanese Navy during World War II.

Completed on 25 July 1944, Kuwa was assigned to Desron 11 of the Combined Fleet for training.  Organizational demands meant she spent the next three months attached to Desdiv 43 (an antisubmarine formation) while officially part of Desron 11.

Kuwas assignment to Desdiv 43 was formalized shortly before the Battle of Leyte Gulf, where she was part of the escort for the Northern Force.  After  sank, Kuwa rescued the majority of her survivors, so overloading the small destroyer that they had to be forbidden from moving until some could be transferred to other ships at Okinawa.

Afterwards, Kuwa returned to Kure for minor repairs, then escorted the battleships  and  during their transportation run to Manila.  Massive air raids deterred the battleships from completing the journey;  their cargo was transferred to fast transports at the Spratly Islands, which Kuwa and others escorted through to Manila Bay.  Kuwa spent the next two weeks operating near Manila.

Kuwas final operation was to escort convoy TA-7 from Manila to Ormoc Bay.  Reaching the destination late on 2 December 1944, Kuwa took up a patrol position seaward of the unloading convoy, while her sister  took on survivors from a previous convoy.  Unfortunately for Kuwa, this meant that when three American destroyers attacked just after midnight, she was their first target.  Charging to meet the enemy, Kuwa was savaged by gunfire, out of action by 0020 and sinking thereafter.  She did not go down alone, however;   was hit by a torpedo, broke in two, and also sank.  The two remaining American destroyers fled, fearing Japanese reprisal;  Take and the convoy also hastily departed, only rescuing eight of Kuwas survivors as they passed.  Many made it to shore, but some were still afloat when US forces returned to rescue Coopers survivors, and were taken prisoner.

Kuwa was struck from the Navy List on 10 February 1945.

Bibliography

External links

Matsu-class destroyers
Ships built by Fujinagata Shipyards
World War II destroyers of Japan
1944 ships